Frank Atkinson may refer to:

 Frank Atkinson (American football) (born 1941), American football defensive lineman
 Frank Atkinson (actor) (1893–1963), British actor and writer
 Frank Atkinson (museum director) (1924–2014), British museum director and curator
 R. Frank Atkinson (1869–1923), British architect

See also
Frank Attkisson (1955–2017), Florida politician